Accra Girls Senior High School is an all female second cycle institution in Accra in the Greater Accra Region, Ghana. It operates as a non-denominational day and boarding school. It runs courses in business, general science, general arts, home economics and visual arts, leading to the award of a West African Senior High School Certificate (WASSCE).

Notable alumni 
 Hannah Afriyie, Ghanaian athlete 
 Nana Akua Owusu Afriyie, Ghanaian politician 
 Alice Annum, Ghanaian athlete
 Moesha Buduong, Ghanaian television personality, actress, and model
 Dzigbordi Dosoo, Ghanaian businesswoman
 Dr. Rose Mensah-Kutin, Ghanaian gender advocate and journalist
 Cynthia Mamle Morrison, Ghanaian politician 
Tina Gifty Naa Ayele Mensah, Ghanaian politician

References

Boarding schools in Ghana
Girls' schools in Ghana
High schools in Ghana
Schools in Accra
1960 establishments in Ghana
Educational institutions established in 1960